Ledmozero is a settlement in the northern part of Muyezersky District in the Republic of Karelia, Russia, located  south-east of Lake Ledmozero. Population: 

In 1905, the population of the settlement consisted of six peasant families comprising 12 males and 18 females.

The settlement is connected to Kochkoma by the Ledmozero–Kochkoma Railway, a part of the Oktyabrskaya Railway system.

Ledmozero had a status of urban-type settlement until 1991, when it was demoted to a rural locality.

References

Rural localities in the Republic of Karelia
Muyezersky District

Former urban-type settlements of Karelia